is a town located in Mie Prefecture, Japan. , the town had an estimated population of 10,818 in 5,247 households and a population density of 140 persons per km².

Geography
Kihō is located near the southern tip of the Kii Peninsula, facing the Pacific Ocean, and is at the extreme southern point of Mie Prefecture, separated from Wakayama Prefecture by the Kumano River. Parts of the town are within the limits of the Yoshino-Kumano National Park. A portion of the Sacred Sites and Pilgrimage Routes in the Kii Mountain Range, a UNESCO World Heritage Site is located within Kihō.

Neighboring municipalities
Mie Prefecture
Kumano
Mihama
Wakayama Prefecture
Shingū

Climate
Kihō has a Humid subtropical climate (Köppen Cfa) characterized by warm summers and cool winters with light to no snowfall.  The average annual temperature in Kihō is 16.0 °C. The average annual rainfall is 2596 mm with September as the wettest month. The temperatures are highest on average in August, at around 25.8 °C, and lowest in January, at around 6.1 °C.

Demographics
Per Japanese census data, the population of Kihō has remained relatively steady over the past 70 years.

History
The area of Kihō was part of the holdings of the Kii Tokugawa clan, administered as part of the Kii-Shingū Domain in the Edo period. After the Meiji restoration, the area was organized into the villages of Ida, Mifune, and Onodani within Minamimuro District of Mie Prefecture. The town of Kihō was established on October 31, 1951 by the merger of these three villages.  On January 10, 2006 the village of Udono also from Minamimuro District, was merged into Kihō.

Government
Kihō has a mayor-council form of government with a directly elected mayor and a unicameral town council of 14 members. Kihō, collectively with the city of Kumano and town of Mihama,  contributes two members to the Mie Prefectural Assembly. In terms of national politics, the town is part of Mie 4th district of the lower house of the Diet of Japan.

Economy
Kihō serves as a commercial center for the surrounding region. Hokuetsu Paper Mills is a major industrial employer.

Education
Kihō has seven public elementary schools and two public middle schools operated by the city government. The town does not have a high school.

Transportation

Railway
 JR Tōkai – Kisei Main Line
 –

Highway

Local attractions 
Sea Turtle Park
Osato Water Park
Udono Castle ruins
Udono Shrine
Hiyuki Falls

References

External links

Kihō official website 

Towns in Mie Prefecture
Populated coastal places in Japan